Semioscopis japonicella is a moth in the family Depressariidae. It was described by Sato in 1989. It is found in Japan.

References

japon
Moths of Japan
Endemic fauna of Japan
Moths described in 1989